Henry Tenedero is an author, professor, education consultant, entrepreneur, and former youth leader in the Philippines. He is an active advocate and mentor at Go Negosyo and served as Vice President and President of the Philippine Marketing Association in 2011 and 2015 respectively. He was a former President of the UST Alumni Association, Inc. He represented the Filipino youth during Pope John Paul II's visit at the Pontifical University of Santo Tomas Manila in 1981.

He was a professorial lecturer at Oxford University, Georgetown University, and the United Nations International Learning Styles Center in New York City. He is currently serving as dean of St. Clare College of Caloocan.

Books 
Breaking the IQ Myth
Super Teacher Excellent in Teaching
Aha! I Gotcha
Impact of Learning-Style Instructional Strategies on Students' Achievement and Attitudes

References 

Living people
Filipino non-fiction writers
University of Santo Tomas alumni
Harvard University alumni
1958 births